George Oscar Sharrott  (November 2, 1869 – January 6, 1932) was a 19th-century Major League Baseball pitcher. He played from 1893 to 1894 with the Brooklyn Grooms.

External links
Baseball Reference

1869 births
1932 deaths
19th-century baseball players
Baseball players from New York (state)
Major League Baseball pitchers
Brooklyn Grooms players
Buffalo Bisons (minor league) players
Syracuse Stars (minor league baseball) players
Amsterdam Carpet Tacks players
Brockton Shoemakers players
Hartford Bluebirds players
New York Metropolitans (minor league) players